Rusokastro Rock (‘Skala Rusokastro’ ska-'la ru-so-'kas-tro) is a twin rock at the north entrance to McFarlane Strait in the South Shetland Islands, Antarctica extending  in northwest–southeast direction and  wide, with its two parts separated by a  wide passage. The area was visited by early 19th century sealers.

The rock is named after the settlement and medieval fortress of Rusokastro in southeastern Bulgaria.

Location

See also 
 Composite Antarctic Gazetteer
 List of Antarctic islands south of 60° S
 SCAR
 Territorial claims in Antarctica

Map
L.L. Ivanov. Antarctica: Livingston Island and Greenwich, Robert, Snow and Smith Islands. Scale 1:120000 topographic map.  Troyan: Manfred Wörner Foundation, 2009.

Notes

References
 Rusokastro Rock. SCAR Composite Gazetteer of Antarctica
 Bulgarian Antarctic Gazetteer. Antarctic Place-names Commission. (details in Bulgarian, basic data in English)

External links
 Rusokastro Rock. Copernix satellite image

Rock formations of Greenwich Island
Bulgaria and the Antarctic